Azorella ameghinoi is a species of flowering plant in the genus Azorella found in and southern Argentina and Chile.

External links
 Azorella ameghinoi.

fuegiana
Flora of Argentina
Flora of Chile
Plants described in 1899
Taxa named by Carlo Luigi Spegazzini